Brennan Curtin (born June 30, 1980 in Daytona Beach, Florida) is an American football offensive tackle. He played college football for the Notre Dame Fighting Irish. He was drafted by the Green Bay Packers in 2003. He suffered what would be a career ending knee injury against the New Orleans Saints in the preseason of 2004. After a brief stint on the New England Patriots practice roster in 2006 he retired. He is the tallest player in the history of the Green Bay Packers organization.

1980 births
Living people
Sportspeople from Daytona Beach, Florida
American football offensive tackles
Notre Dame Fighting Irish football players
Green Bay Packers players
Players of American football from Florida